Amy Nicole Tutt  (born ) is a retired Canadian volleyball player, who played as a wing spiker. She was part of the Canada women's national volleyball team.

She participated at the 2002 FIVB Volleyball Women's World Championship in Germany. and the 2003 FIVB World Grand Prix.
On club level she played with Club Voleibol Benidorm.

Clubs
 Club Voleibol Benidorm (2002)

References

1976 births
Living people
Canadian women's volleyball players
Place of birth missing (living people)
Wing spikers
Expatriate volleyball players in Spain
Canadian expatriate sportspeople in Spain